Forgotten Prophecies is Paragon's 8th studio album, released in mid-2007. Bassist Jan Bünning left the band shortly after recordings of the album were completed. The album is also the first to feature drummer Christian Gripp.

Songs 
"Hammer Of The Gods" (Christian / Bünning) - 5:24
"Arise" (Christian / Gripp / Babuschkin) - 5:08
"Face Of Death" (Kruse / Babuschkin) - 3:51
"Halls Of Doom" (Christian / Gripp / Babuschkin) - 4:36
"Revelations" (Christian) - 2:06
"Forgotten Prophecies" (Christian / Bünning / Babuschkin) - 4:57
"Agony" (Christian / Kruse / Babuschkin) - 7:31
"Souleaters" (Christian / Kruse / Bünning / Babuschkin) - 5:09
"Gangland" (Christian / Gripp / Babuschkin) - 4:59
"Wargods" (Christian / Babuschkin) - 3:20
"Deny The Cross (Overkill cover)" - 4:38

The album will also be released as a Limited Digipak-version, including a bonus DVD with these songs:

"The Legacy"
"Traitor"
"Impaler"
"Revenge"
"Across The Wastelands"
"Palace Of Sin"
"Armies Of The Tyrant"
"Thunderstorm"
"Deathsquad"
"Beyond The Veil"

Credits 
Andreas Babuschkin - Vocals
Martin Christian - Guitars / Backing vocals
Günny Kruse - Guitars / Backing vocals
Jan Bünning - Bass / Backing vocals
Christian Gripp - Drums

References
https://web.archive.org/web/20070324133641/http://www.roadrunnerrecords.com/blabbermouth.net/news.aspx?mode=Article&newsitemID=69033

2007 albums
Paragon (band) albums